Russell L. "Russ" Stilwell was a Democratic member of the Indiana House of Representatives, representing the 74th District since 1996. He was Majority Floor Leader until his 2010 defeat by Sue Ellspermann.

References

External links
State Representative Russ Stilwell, Majority Leader official Indiana State Legislature site

 

Democratic Party members of the Indiana House of Representatives
1948 births
Living people
University of Southern Indiana alumni
People from Oakland City, Indiana
People from Boonville, Indiana